Table tennis at the 2014 Summer Youth Olympics was held from 17 to 23 August at the Wutaishan Sports Center in Nanjing, China.

Qualification

Each National Olympic Committee (NOC) can enter a maximum of 2 competitors, 1 per each gender. As hosts, China is given the maximum quota should they not qualify an athlete and a further 8 spots, 4 in each gender, will be allocated by the Tripartite Commission, however one spot was unused and was reallocated. The remaining 54 places shall be decided in four qualification phases: the 2014 World Qualification Event, the Under-18 World Rankings, six Road to Nanjing series events and six continental qualification tournaments.

To be eligible to participate at the Youth Olympics athletes must have been born between 1 January 1996 and 31 December 1999.

Boys

Girls

Mixed Team

Schedule

The schedule was released by the Nanjing Youth Olympic Games Organizing Committee.

All times are CST (UTC+8)

Medal summary

Medal table

Events

References

External links
Official Results Book – Table tennis

 
2014 Summer Youth Olympics events
Youth Summer Olympics
2014
Table tennis competitions in China